Sunset is the fifth studio album from French power pop group Superbus.

Track listing
 "All Alone"
 "À la chaîne"
 "Smith n’ Wesson"
 "Mini"
 "L’Annonce"
 "Whisper" – feat. Richie Sambora
 "Calling you"
 "Mrs Better"
 "Get real"
 "Duo" – feat Marco Kamaras
 "L’Été n’est pas loin"

Superbus (band) albums
2012 albums
Polydor Records albums